Events from the year 1519 in Ireland.

Incumbent
Lord: Henry VIII

Events
 Richard Mór Burke, became 9th lord of Clanricarde

Deaths
 Richard Óge Burke, 7th lord of Clanricarde

References

 
1510s in Ireland
Ireland
Years of the 16th century in Ireland